Blas Villate y de la Herra, count of Valmaseda (February 3, 1824, in Sestao – January 8, 1882, in Madrid) was a Spanish general. He was several times governor of Cuba:

 September 24, 1867 - December 21, 1867 (acting governor)
 December 13, 1870 - July 11, 1872
 March 8, 1875 to January 18, 1876

References 

Governors of Cuba
People of the Spanish colonial Americas
Spanish colonial period of Cuba
19th-century South American people
1824 births
1882 deaths